Ikko Mikke (The Soulmates) is a 2020 Indian Punjabi-language, romantic drama film directed by Pankaj Verma and produced by Sartaaj Film and Firdaus Production, under the banner of Firdaus Production, Seven Colors Motion Pictures and Saga Music. The film starring Satinder Sartaaj and Aditi Sharma. The story of the film follows Nihaal (played by Satinder Sartaj), a sculptor and Dimple (played by Aditi Sharma), a theatre artiste. The two in love, elope. After marriage due to differences, they decide to separate but then their souls get swapped.

The film was released on 13 March 2020.

Cast
 Satinder Sartaaj as Nihaal (sculptor) 
 Aditi Sharma as Dimple (theatre artiste)
 Sardar Sohi 
 Shiwani Saini as Neeru
 Mahabir Bhullar
 Vandana Sharma 
 Bego Balwinder 
 Vijay Kumar 
 Navdeep Kaler
 Maninder Valley 
 Raj Dhaliwal 
 Noor Chahal 
 Umang Sharma

Release
The film was released on 13 March 2020.

Soundtrack

Soundtrack of the film was composed by Beat Minister whereas lyrics were penned by Satinder Sartaaj.

Reception
Gurnaaz Kaur of The Tribune gave two and half stars out of five and noted thy the chemistry between Sartaaj and Aditi was fresh and heart touching. She found the soul swapping between the couple as baffling. Praising the music and cinematography she termed the film as soul-stirring.

References

External links
 

Punjabi-language Indian films
2020s Punjabi-language films
2020 films
Indian romantic drama films
2020 romantic drama films